Will Pryce (born 5 December 2002) is a professional rugby league footballer who plays as a  and  for the Huddersfield Giants in the Betfred Super League and the England Knights at international level.

Background
Pryce is of Jamaican descent and is the son of former England and Great Britain international Leon Pryce. His uncle Karl Pryce, and distant relations Waine Pryce and Steve Pryce are former professional rugby league footballers, as was Geoff Pryce.

He played his junior rugby league for Siddal and has played for England at youth level.

Playing career

2021
In 2021, he made his Super League début for Huddersfield against the Catalans Dragons.

2022
In round 6 of the 2022 Super League season, Pryce was sent off for a dangerous tackle in Huddersfield's 14-6 loss against Hull F.C.  Pryce was subsequently suspended for ten matches.

In December, it was announced that Pryce had signed a two-year contract with the Newcastle Knights in the NRL, starting in 2024.

References

External links
SL profile

2002 births
Living people
England Knights national rugby league team players
English rugby league players
Huddersfield Giants players
Will
Rugby league five-eighths
Rugby league players from Bradford